Coolock is a large suburban area, centred on a village, on Dublin city's Northside in Ireland. Coolock is crossed by the Santry River, a prominent feature in the middle of the district, with a linear park and ponds. The Coolock suburban area encompasses parts of three Dublin postal districts: Dublin 5, Dublin 13 and Dublin 17.

The extensive civil parish of Coolock takes in the land between the Tonlegee Road (as far as Donaghmede) and the Malahide Road, as well as the lands on either side of the Malahide Road between Darndale and Artane, and the lands either side of the Oscar Traynor Road on the approach to Santry.

Coolock is also the name of the barony which accounts for most of north Dublin city, from the coast as far as Phoenix Park, and stretching north as far as Swords.

History
Coolock has a history dating back over 3,500 years – a Bronze-Age burial site in the area dates back to 1500 BC. The settlement grew up around a small early-Christian church. A Catholic church, St. John's, was later built in the area (see Parish of Coolock (Roman Catholic) and Coolock parish (Church of Ireland) for more). The feudal barony of Coolock was granted in 1199 by Henry II to the Archbishop of Dublin.

Coolock remained a small village until the 1950s, with lands around the village being further developed over time, notably Bonnybrook and Kilmore West, between which a new centre to the area formed. At one time the old village was on the Malahide Road but that road was diverted and now passes slightly to the east of the village; in the meantime, a secondary hamlet, Newtown Coolock, developed further north.

Later again, lands in the north of Coolock were developed to form the new districts of Darndale and Priorswood.

Nature
Coolock lies on either side of the valley of the Santry River and includes a diversion from the little Naniken River. It is a relatively flat area a little above sea level, with a linear park around the Santry, and small green areas scattered through residential developments.

Location / character

Coolock lies at the centre of the majority working-class Northside suburbs such as Kilbarrack, Donaghmede and the Edenmore part of Raheny, and itself includes localities such as Ayrfield, Bonnybrook, Darndale, Priorswood, Greencastle and Kilmore West. As with other large suburban areas, such as Tallaght or Swords, there is no legal definition for Coolock, and so no definitive population figures, but it is one of Dublin's largest residential areas.  It is crossed by the Oscar Traynor Road, running from the Malahide Road to Santry, and named for the War of Independence politician, later long-serving minister, Oscar Traynor.

The majority of Coolock, excluding Ayrfield, was built-up by the then city authority, Dublin Corporation, as part of a programme of the phased inner-city slum clearance (between, roughly, 1952 and 1987). Dublin City Council calculates that addresses containing "Coolock" comprise the largest stock of local authority houses within its jurisdiction and the area is central to the linear range of local authority building that took place between the 1960s and the 1980s across Dublin's Northside - i.e. Ballymun including Poppintree, Kilmore, Coolock, Edenmore, Kilbarrack and Donaghmede.

The permanent Traveller halting site estates (which differ in layout to traditional halting sites) of Cara Park and Dominick Park, found in the Belcamp area (along the N32) are among the largest halting site facilities provided by local authorities in Ireland. They contain an adult education centre and pre-school facilities for the local Traveller population, both located beside Dominick Park. At least one smaller, more traditional, Traveller settlement is found in the area, close to the Clare Hall Shopping Centre. King of the Travellers, Jim Watt, is a resident of this settlement.

Amenities

Public parks in the area include the Santry River Linear Park and in Bonnybrook the Stardust Memorial Garden which is dedicated to the 48 people who lost their lives in the Stardust nightclub. Parnells GAA club is based in Coolock village.

Coolock is also a centre of local government activity, with a Dublin City Council major centre, NEAR FM community radio station, a Health Services Executive centre and a recycling centre.

Localities
 Ayrfield, an area beginning on the north side of the Tonlegee Road, predominantly within the Dublin 13 postal code, opposite Edenmore, and near Donaghmede and Darndale, containing several estates such as Rathvale, Limewood (part of Dublin 5), Millbrook, Slademore, Foxhill, Greenwood and Ard na Greine. Ayrfield has one primary school, St. Pauls Junior and Senior National School. The main access road, Blunden Drive, is the home of Ayrfield Credit Union, Ayrfield Community Centre and O'Tooles GAC clubhouse and playing pitches. Ayrfield is also a parish in the Howth deanery of the Roman Catholic Archdiocese of Dublin. It is served by the Church of St Paul. It is also home to Ayrfield United F.C. which has pitches beside the credit union.
Belcamp, today comprising some housing between Darndale and Priorswood but historically referring to a broader rural area. It is situated near the site of the former Belcamp Cottage and included cottages demolished to make way for the N32 road. Belcamp Hall, designed by architect James Hoban is a feature.
Bonnybrook,  a locality within the core of Coolock, above the original village, site of the main shopping centre, and with its own Catholic church and primary school.
Clonshaugh, (now in Dublin 17) stretching from the large Clonshaugh Industrial Estate opposite Kilmore all the way to the AUL, close to Baskin Lane.  This includes Riverside, a housing estate at the side of the Santry River, with over 500 residents, first described as being in Santry, but with the postal district changed from Dublin 5 (old main Coolock code) to Dublin 17, and Newbury, situated behind Riverside, accessed from the Clonshaugh Road.
Darndale, built as a range of social housing estates, east of Clonshaugh and west of Clare Hall. It comprises Buttercup Park, Marigold Court, Primrose Grove, Snowdrop Walk and Tulip Court.
Greencastle, a locality within the core of Coolock, above the original village.
Kilmore as a whole is a large area west of the Malahide Road and east of the M1, where Coolock meets Artane and Beaumont; of this, Kilmore West is entirely within Coolock and includes the sub-locality of Cromcastle, which features numerous multi-storey council flat blocks in the same style as blocks in Kilbarrack.
Priorswood, a small, densely populated locality found between Belcamp and Clonshaugh, comprising the housing estates of Moatview, Fairfield and Ferrycarrig.
St. Brendan's Estate, located across the Malahide Road from Coolock village proper, and comprises St. Brendan's Drive, Avenue and Park, Moatfield and Dunree Park.

Located between Donaghmede and Coolock is Clare Hall, a later housing estate, which includes a small shopping precinct, and the large Clarehall Shopping Centre which is anchored by Tesco Extra.

There are a number of roads named after the 1969 Moon landing, including Tranquility Grove (after Tranquility Base), Eagle Park (Lunar Module Eagle), Apollo Way (Apollo 11), Armstrong Walk (Neil Armstrong) and Aldrin Walk (Buzz Aldrin).

Religion
Coolock has given its name to religious divisions over a long period, and the primary historical ones are discussed at Parish of Coolock (Roman Catholic), and (from the Act of Supremacy), Parish of Coolock (Church of Ireland). Both Catholic (multiple) and Church of Ireland buildings stand within the area today. In the Catholic divisions, additional parishes today include Bonnybrook and Ayrfield (encompassing the Greenwood estate).

Education
 Chanel College, a large boys secondary school and adult education source, founded in 1955

 The Donahies Community School, a large secondary school and adult education source, founded in 1977
 Coláiste Dhúlaigh Post Primary, Co-ed secondary school in Coolock, located beside Northside Shopping Centre.
 Coláiste Dhúlaigh College of Further Education provides third-level courses (QQI, BTEC and FETAC)
 Mercy College is a voluntary, Catholic girls secondary school
 St. Pauls Junior and Senior National School, Ayrfield
 St. Francis, Priorswood
 The now-defunct Catholic Belcamp College secondary school in the nearby area of Balgriffin, which operated from 1893–2004

Businesses and retail facilities

The outskirts of Coolock host several factories and industrial estates. Cadbury Ireland has been manufacturing chocolate products since 1957, for both the Irish market and for export. The nearby Tayto Crisps factory manufactured snack foods until it closed in 2005. Other businesses include: Odeon cinema, Leisure Plex centre, Power city, McDonald's, Crown paint, a Montessori etc. all of which are located on the Malahide Road.

Notable retail facilities include Northside Shopping Centre, Ireland's first covered shopping centre, situated near accesses to the M1 and M50, with more than 70 outlets and a city council swimming pool.

Popular culture
Famous historical figures linked to the area included Henry Grattan of Belcamp Park, and the novelist Charles Lever.

Film & television
The Coolock area was featured extensively during location shooting for the 1991 film The Commitments, directed by Alan Parker and starring a mainly unknown cast at the time.

Transport
Coolock, which is not crossed by any rail systems, is serviced by main roads, including the N32 and Oscar Traynor Roads which link to the M1, and by the following Dublin Bus routes:
 17A - Kilbarrack to Blanchardstown Centre
 27 - Jobstown to Coolock (Clare Hall Avenue)
 27A - Coolock (Blunden Drive) to Eden Quay
 27B - Eden Quay to Harristown
 27X - Belfield (U.C.D) to Clare Hall Avenue
 42 - Lower Abbey Street to Malahide or Portmarnock
 43 - Lower Abbey Street to Swords
 15 - Ballycullen Road to Clongriffin

See also
 List of subdivisions of County Dublin
 List of towns and villages in Ireland

References

 
Towns and villages in Dublin (city)